Ján Počiatek (born 16 September 1970) is a Slovak politician.

Early life and education
Počiatek speaks English fluently  and also  has an advanced knowledge of  German and Russian. Počiatek is a graduate of the University of Economics in Bratislava. He graduated in 1997 as a qualified engineer in economics.

Career
Počiatek served as Minister of Finance from 2006 to 2010, and as Minister of Transport, Construction, and Regional Development from 2012 to 2016, both in the government of Prime Minister Robert Fico. Under his leadership, Slovakia agreed a 1.9-billion-euro ($2.1 billion) public-private partnership for a consortium led by Spanish infrastructure group Ferrovial’s Cintra unit to build two highways in the capital Bratislava.

Other activities
 European Bank for Reconstruction and Development (EBRD), Ex-Officio Member of the Board of Governors (2006-2010)
 European Investment Bank (EIB), Ex-Officio Member of the Board of Governors (2006-2010)

Recognition
For his contribution in preparing Slovakia's entry into the Eurozone, the international financial affairs publication The Banker named Počiatek as the "Best finance minister for the year 2008 in Europe."

Controversy
Počiatek caused controversy when he participated in a yacht trip on the Mediterranean organised by a private equity group accused of profiting from currency speculation before the koruna was revalued against the euro in May 2008. Pociatek denied wrongdoing but later apologised.

By late 2008, opposition pressure was mounting again to dismiss Počiatek over his alleged mishandling of a court case involving state-owned lottery company Tipos.

In 2019 video of Počiatek recorded through a candid camera in the prosecutor general's office (Dobroslav Trnka) was leaked, in this video Počiatek openly discussed and joked about corruption skills of Slovak National Party leader Ján Slota, and discussed with Trnka how to cover up the Tipos mishandling.

See also

National Bank of Slovakia
Economy of Slovakia
Slovak koruna former currency of the Slovak Republic
Slovak euro coins current currency in Slovakia
Ľubomír Jahnátek Minister of Economy of the Slovak Republic

References

1970 births
Living people
Politicians from Bratislava
Finance ministers of Slovakia
Transport ministers of Slovakia
Direction – Social Democracy politicians
Slovak economists 
University of Economics in Bratislava alumni
Members of the National Council (Slovakia) 2010-2012